Makharadze is a Georgian surname which may refer to:

 Makharadze brothers, one of the Georgian horsemen in Wild West shows
 Filipp Makharadze, Georgian bolshevik
 Kakhi Makharadze, Georgian footballer
 Avtandil Makharadze, Georgian actor
 Kote Makharadze, Georgian actor and sports commentator
 Mikheil Makharadze, Georgian politician and historian
 Gueorgui Makharadze, Georgian diplomat
 Zauri Makharadze, Ukrainian footballer of Georgian origin
 Ozurgeti, a former name of that city

Surnames of Georgian origin
Georgian-language surnames